Dorothy Smith Cummings (March 28, 1903 – September 17, 1995) was a seven time national women's target archery champion. She won her first title in 1919, when she was 16 years old. She won the gold medal six more times in the United States Championships in 1921, 1922, 1924, 1925, 1926 and 1931.

Biography
She was born on March 28, 1903 to Louis Carter Smith.  She was inducted into the Archery Hall of Fame in 1974.

References

American female archers
1903 births
1995 deaths
Place of birth missing
20th-century American women
20th-century American people